Wishaw  is a large town in North Lanarkshire, Scotland, on the edge of the Clyde Valley,  south-east of Glasgow city centre. The Burgh of Wishaw was formed in 1855 within Lanarkshire. it formed a joint large burgh with its neighbour Motherwell from 1920 until its dissolution when Scottish local authorities were restructured in 1975, and was then in Motherwell district within the Strathclyde region until 1996. The town is part of the Motherwell and Wishaw constituency. It has the postal code of ML2 and the dialling code 01698.

Geography and climate
Wishaw lies within North Lanarkshire, the fourth largest local authority in Scotland by population. The town is located in the relatively level Central Belt area; while there are valleys and high moors, there are no hills or summits over 1,640 feet.

The defined "locality" of Wishaw had a population of 30,290 in 2016, the 26th largest such place in the country. Along with its neighbours of Hamilton, Bellshill and Motherwell it had been considered to form part of the Greater Glasgow conurbation, which as of 2019 had a population of around 1,670,000 (around a third of Scotland's total); however, since 2016 Wishaw, Motherwell and Bellshill have been officially considered separate from the Glasgow 'settlement' due to small gaps in the chain of occupied postcodes used to determine a grouping, and instead form their own settlement which itself has the fifth largest population in Scotland at 124,000.

Wishaw experiences mild summers and cool winters, with the most rainfall coming between October and March. Snow, while not unheard of during winters, is not the norm. Most winters in Wishaw see around 10–20 days of snow. The warmest month on average is July, with an average daily temperature of 14.7 °C, while the coldest is January with an average daily temperature of 2.3 °C.

Wishaw lies on two rivers, the Clyde running near Overton and Netherton and its tributary the South Calder Water, further north near Coltness and Newmains.

Etymology
It is not certain how Wishaw's name came into being. The town is named after Wishaw House, a large manor built in the woods by the South Calder Water. The house was probably built some time after the sale of the lands of Coltness, Wishaw, Watstein and Stain to the predecessor of Lord Belhaven: Hamilton of Uddsten. It could be a corruption of "Via shaw" meaning "way through the woods", which would make sense as an ancient Roman road was built through the modern town. Yet another theory is that the name derives from "Wee Shaw", meaning small wood, or that the "wis" comes from the medieval Scots for "water", meaning "water wood".

In Scottish Gaelic, the main name of the town is, Camas Neachdain

History

Ancient history
The area of what is now Wishaw once lay on important Roman roads that ran through the areas of the Clyde (Latin – Cluta) and South Calder Water. In fact, the current Main Street is based on a road built by the Romans. Another such road ran close to Wishaw House.

In the 1960s, a pagan religious figurine was found in the woods near Netherton, showing that there was some form of settlement near Wishaw before the Christianisation of Scotland, which occurred between 400 and 600 AD.

Medieval era 
A small church was established by a bend (camas/cambo- in Cumbric) on the banks of the Clyde near what is now Netherton in the eighth century. There is however dispute to whether this was named after (or established by) Neithon of Alt Clut or perhaps St Ninian. Nonetheless, the area became known as Cambusnethan or Kamnethan from then on. The site of the original church remains as a ruined burial ground, including an impressive mausoleum to Lord Belhaven. The churchyard is notably round, similar to those found in Wales and Ireland, suggesting it could have been built on an earlier Celtic temple. Excavated from this area was the Cambusnethan Stone, a large Christian tablet created by the Strathclyde Britons.

In the 12th century, a Norman lord constructed a large manor near Gowkthrapple, as well as another small church. This was the beginning of the parish of Cambusnethan, which lasted up until 1930. In the 13th century, administrative control of the parish was ceded to Glasgow from the previous Kelso Abbey. Small fortresses and tower houses were built, and after the Scottish Wars of Independence, the barony was transferred by Robert the Bruce to local lords, however the title lay abandoned by the 20th century. The Somervilles of Cambusnethan were the principal aristocrats in the area, although sold their land to Sir James Steuart,later Lord Provost of Edinburgh in 1653. Wishaw House is thought to date back to the 15th century, and appears on Pont's map of Scotland from 1583, as Wisha. The settlements of Greenhead, Camnethan, Peddyr and Overtoun of Camnethan also appear.

The ruined church on Kirk Road, mere yards away from the current Cambusnethan church, is thought to date back to the 1600s or earlier.

Modern era 
In the 18th century agriculture in the area consisted mainly of growing oats although some wheat and pear trees were cultivated. Members of the Reformed Presbyterian Church took up the favourable terms of the proprietor to enable them to establish a congregation in Wishaw in 1792. The village itself was laid out in 1794, named Cambusnethan, and later renamed Wishawtown.

In 1801 the population of Wishaw was about 400 and that of the whole parish only 1972. In the 1830s Lord Belhaven set up a distillery in Wishaw. Other nineteenth century industries included coal mining, iron and steel making, foundry work, railway-waggon building and fire-clay making. Wishaw grew dramatically in the 1830s, with railways and gasworks coming to the town, many collieries opening during this time period. By the time the Caledonian Railway's main line came through Wishaw in 1848 it was a major mining centre fueling an important part of Scotland's industrial heartland. There were also factories for needle-work and tambouring, and confectionery. On 4 September 1855, the town was incorporated with the villages of Coltness and Stewarton to form the Burgh of Wishaw, with a population of approximately 5,000. Four years later, in 1859, St.Ignatius Parish Church was established, and the church built on Young Street, where it remains to this day. In 1882 Groome recorded that there were 5 schools in Wishaw as well as others in nearby villages. Wishaw in the middle of the 19th century was visited by the Polish composer Frédéric Chopin. Chopin was entertained at Wishaw house and played there for the family, the Hamiltons of Belhaven.

Wishaw and its nearby neighbour of Motherwell were once the centre of steel manufacture in Scotland, as both towns were located either side of the former Ravenscraig steelworks which closed in 1992. The (now-defunct) local firm of R Y Pickering & Co Ltd (later Norbrit-Pickering) built railway rolling stock (especially wagons) and many tramcars for tram systems throughout the UK. One of its last tramcar orders was for 10 double-decker trams for Aberdeen Corporation Tramways in 1949. In November 1996, the world's worst recorded outbreak of E. coli O157 occurred in the town, in which 21 people died and around 200 were infected.

Recent decades 
The town has recovered from the loss of industry such as steelworks and coal mines which were shuttered in the 1980s and 1990s. In the 2014 Scottish independence referendum, Wishaw along with its neighbour Motherwell, voted 52% in favour of Scottish independence, meanwhile 48% voted against independence. Since 2015, Wishaw has voted SNP in both general elections and local Scottish elections, replacing Labour as the dominant party of the town. Wishaw also has a Scottish Conservative Councillor since 2017.

These days, North Lanarkshire Council suggest that the majority of the biggest employers in the town are supermarkets, with the exceptions of Royal Mail, which has its main Scottish distribution centre at Shieldmuir and the NHS as a result of University Hospital Wishaw. There are many service industry businesses located in the town's industrial areas, though none with more than a few hundred employees.

Education
At present there are three high schools in the area: Clyde Valley High School in Overtown, and Coltness High School and St Aidan's High School, both in Coltness. St. Aidan's High School serves not only Catholic pupils from Wishaw, but nearby towns such as Newmains, Shotts and Carluke. St. Aidans, therefore has the highest number of pupils at around 1,100.

Primary schools in Wishaw include Calderbridge, St. Thomas', Thornlie, St. Aidan's, Cambusnethan, St. Ignatius' and Wishaw Academy (with both the latter two schools being a joint campus).

The town does not have a university or college at present, with the nearest college being Motherwell College, based in Ravenscraig, and the University of the West of Scotland (formerly Bell College of Technology) in Hamilton being the nearest university.

Health establishments

Wishaw has a general hospital, now known as University Hospital Wishaw, in the Craigneuk area. It serves nearby settlements such as Motherwell, Newmains and Shotts. It is one of three acute hospitals in Lanarkshire, the others being Monklands Hospital in Airdrie and Hairmyres Hospital in East Kilbride.

Also based in the town, on the site of the old town library in Kenilworth Avenue, is the Houldsworth Centre which houses a café, public toilet, Wishaw library and Wishaw Health Centre. The centre opened in April 2015 along with a multi-storey car park.

Town centre
Main Street is the predominant shopping area in Wishaw. It is partly made up of major national stores such as Peacock's, Poundland, Iceland and Greggs

The Main Street shopping area also features small independent retailers.
There are also many supermarkets in the area, with a new small format Asda in the eastern suburb of Newmains that opened in October 2007.

Wishaw also has the "Caledonian Centre", a shopping complex in the northern suburb of Craigneuk consisting of other national store chains such as Argos, Matalan, B & M, Pets at Home and The Range.

Recent developments

The first stage of the modern town centre regeneration programme was completed in 2004, with a new car park being constructed between the local library and health centre and with the formation of a taxi rank adjacent to the library also a water fountain was put on the ground of Wishaw Library which looks like the old one which used to stand near the former Wishaw Health Centre.

A piece of eyesore land between Station Road and Alexander Street (the railway station and sports centre) was converted into a park and ride facility, as part of this programme. This has led to a decrease in railway parking and traffic next to the station. The facility was later increased in size as it was too small.

In late 2011, Kitchener Street was converted from a small neighbourhood to a main road, routing traffic away from the Main Street to Kenilworth Avenue, where a new roundabout was built. Lammermore Terrace, which was previously one-way, was converted into a two-way street.

In 2014 work on a new modern housing estate called Ravenwood began on the site of the old Lammermuir school, which became was renamed Calderbridge and moved to a new building 600m away.  The neighbourhood was finished in 2016 and now consists of around 50 houses.

Religion

Wishaw has many churches in it of various kinds and denominations.

There are several Church of Scotland congregations. Serving principally the town centre are Wishaw Old Parish Church, the oldest building in Wishaw with the Town Clock in the steeple as the town's principal landmark, and South Wishaw Parish Church, on the outskirts of the town centre.

Serving the outlying parts of Wishaw are – Cambusnethan North Parish Church, Cambusnethan Old and Morningside Parish Church, Craigneuk and Belhaven Church, Coltness Memorial Church (Newmains) and St. Mark's Church (Coltness). The Church of Scotland "charges" have been reduced in recent years through the union of Thornlie and Chalmers Churches to form South Wishaw Parish Church.

The town also has a United Free Church, an Episcopal Church dedicated to St. Andrew, a Baptist church (both in Belhaven Terrace), a Gospel Hall (Ebenezer Gospel Hall), a Methodist church (now known as Netherton Methodist Church), a Christian Outreach Centre and five Roman Catholic Churches: St. Ignatius of Loyola (Young Street), St. Aidan's (Coltness), St. Thomas' (Pather), St. Brigid's (Newmains) and St. Patrick's (Shieldmuir).

The town has large Catholic population and strong Catholic links. These Catholics are mainly descended from the Irish Catholics who fled the Famine to settle in and around Glasgow, with many coming to Lanarkshire in particular. Today, the descendants of these immigrants constitute most of the Catholics in the town but there are also Catholics who are from other ethnicities, in particular those from the Italian and Polish communities in Scotland. Some Catholics are even ethnically Scottish.

Governance 

Wishaw is represented by several tiers of elected government. North Lanarkshire Council, the unitary local authority for Wishaw, is based at Motherwell, and is the executive, deliberative and legislative body responsible for local governance. The Scottish Parliament is responsible for devolved matters such as education, health and justice, while reserved matters are dealt with by the Parliament of the United Kingdom.

Westminster
The Motherwell and Wishaw constituency is represented in the UK Parliament by Marion Fellows MP (SNP) Scottish Parliament

In the Scottish Parliament, the constituency is represented by Clare Adamson (SNP).

In addition to this, Wishaw is represented by seven regional MSPs from the Central Scotland electoral region.

Sports, restaurants and recreation

Leisure and entertainments
Wishaw has a very large Mecca Bingo hall in Kirk Road. In recent years, the town has turned into a nightspot when it comes to pubs and clubs that are on offer. The Commercial Hotel has a nightclub and also a restaurant, bar and hotel, with rooms and accommodation for overnight stay. Pubs include: Girdwood's, a well established and long running live music venue https://girdwoods.co.uk/', the Cross Keys, the Waverley, and The Corner which shut down in 2012 has been replaced with the bar-restaurant Corrigans.  On Stewarton Street, near the town centre, there is an Irish pub named The Cross Keys Inn. The pub regularly shows Celtic games, as the majority of its customers are supporters of the club.

Eating establishments
Wishaw is not short of eating establishments, from small local cafes to international global chains such as McDonald's. As well as the Commercial, the town is home to a Wetherspoons restaurant, known as the Wishaw Malt, directly opposite the Mecca bingo. There is an Indian buffet restaurant, known as the Pink Turban, located in the Waterloo suburb. Wishaw has a McDonald's restaurant and a KFC restaurant (both located on Glasgow Road), which opened in 2004 and 1942 respectively. The grand opening of KFC was a joyous occasion with Frank Roy MP cutting the ribbon and also being the first person in Wishaw to sample a Zinger box meal. The main street also contains two national sandwich chains, Subway and Greggs. The town is also host to a modern Scottish restaurant called Artisan, which may have one of the largest ranges of whisky in Scotland. It also has large number of independent takeaway restaurants and cafes, most of which are located in the main street.
The Cafe Shabbab is located in Newmains.

A Pizza Hut opened in 2017, located on Main Street from an old Blockbuster LLC and a Domino's opened in September 2018, in a previously abandoned shop on Kirk Road.

Sports facilities
There is no professional football team in Wishaw. Many of the town's residents are followers of Rangers, Celtic and near-neighbours Motherwell. There is however a junior football team, Wishaw, which plays its home games at Beltane Park, near to the town's sports centre. There is also a large juvenile football club, Wishaw Wycombe Wanderers, who have many registered young players, playing football in age groups from Under 6s to Under 21s.

Wishaw has a King George's Field in memorial to King George V, next to the town's hospital. This small park has two full-sized football pitches as well as a swing park and play area.

To the northwest of the town, there is a large golf course.

The town's municipal sports centre also includes two small swimming pools, badminton and martial arts facilities and gymnastic equipment. A full-length running track is also on site along with a full-sized football pitch. Long jump pits and throwing cages are also issued within the track. There are also 5-a-side astroturf pitches for football, where many local games are held.
Elsewhere, all-weather pitches and a children's play area behind Morrison's have been closed for a new shared campus primary school by St. Ignatius Primary and Wishaw Academy Primary. The local council has made no announcement on whether these facilities will be replaced.

The town previously had a large swimming pool complete with a large spectator grandstand, an underwater viewpoint and diving facilities (with boards at 1.5m, 3m and 5m). This was closed during the late 1990s to make way for a much smaller facility on the site of the town's sports centre. The reason given for this decision was the cost of maintaining such a facility for a town as small as Wishaw. Over the years it had played host to many regional swimming events and also benefited from being within walking distance of the two main secondary schools in the area as well as a host of primary schools.

University Hospital Wishaw also has a heat pool for specialist physio treatment.

Town park
Wishaw also has a town park named after Lord Belhaven, Belhaven Park. It has a swing park with plenty of climbing frames and slides, and plenty of benches. There is a pathway at the back of the park which leads through the trees and into a council estate. In March 2011, the parks play-area underwent a significant upgrade.

Transport

Location grid

Bus

As of July 2022, the following operators provide routes through Wishaw to various destinations;

JMB Travel

41 Lanark to Hamilton, via Carluke, Wishaw, Craigneuk, & Motherwell (Mon-Sat Daytime. No Evening Service)

56 Shotts to North Morthwell, via Allanton, Newmains, Wishaw, University Hosp Wishaw, Muirhouse, & Motherwell (Mon-Sat Daytime. No Evening Service)

802 Bogside to North Motherwell, via Netherton & Muirhouse (Mon-Sat Placement Journeys)

Stuarts Coaches

210X Lawhill to University Hospital Wishaw, via Law & Wishaw (Mon to Fri. One Way Early Morning Only)

210 Lawhill to University Hospital Wishaw, via Law & Wishaw (Mon to Sat Evening Only. Sunday All Day)

240X Lanark to Glasgow, via Carluke, Wishaw, Craigneuk, & Motherwell (Mon to Fri Daytime)

241X Lanark to Glasgow, via Carluke, Wishaw, Netherton, Muirhouse, & Motherwell (Mon to Sat Daytime)

248 University Hospital Wishaw to Holytown, via Pather, Wishaw, Coltness, Cleland, Newarthill, & New Stevenston (Mon to Sat Evening Only)

248C Monkland Hosp/Airdrie to Law, via Chapelhall, Holytown, New Stevenston, Cleland, University Hosp Wishaw, Wishaw (Mon to Fri Daytime Only)

365 Torbothie to University Hosp Wishaw via, Stane, Dykehead, Allanton, Morningside, Newmains, & Wishaw (Mon to Sat Daytime Only)

366 Harthill to University Hosp Wishaw via, Stane, Dykehead, Allanton, Newmains, Wishaw (Some Journeys Start/Finish at Ravenscraig Sports Centre) (Mon to Sun Daytime Only)

367 Harthill to Ravenscraig via Dykehead, Stane, Allanton, Newmains, Wishaw, University Hosp Wishaw, & Craignuek (Mon-Sat Evening & All Day Sunday)

Whitelaws

253 University Hosp Wishaw to Coalburn, via Netherton, Muirhouse, Motherwell, Hamilton, Larkhall, Blackwood, & Lesmahagow (Mon-Sat Daytime Only)

First Glasgow

93 Coltness to Carbarns, via Coltness, Wishaw, University Hosp Wishaw, Netherton (Mon to Sat Daytime Only)

193 Cleland to Pather, via Coltness, Wishaw, & University Hosp Wishaw (All Day Sunday)

210 Law to University Hosp Wishaw, via Law & Wishaw (Mon to Fri. One Early Morning Journey And One Evening Journey)

240 Overtown to Glasgow, via Wishaw, Craignuek, Motherwell, Bellshill, Birkenshaw, Tollcross, & Parkhead (Mon to Sun all day)

241 Cleland to North Motherwell, via Coltness, Wishaw, University Hosp Wishaw, Netherton, Muirhouse, & Motherwell (Mon to Sun all day. Evening service runs between Coltness and Motherwell only)

242 Overtown/Pather to Holytown/Maxim Park, via Wishaw, Wishawhill, Craignuek, Motherwell, & Holytown (Mon to Sat. Early And Late Peak Journeys Start Or End At Maxim Park. First & Last Journey Start Or End At Overtown Depot)

251 University Hosp Wishaw to Larkhall, via Wishaw, Waterloo, Overtown, & Garrion Bridge (Mon-Sun all day)

266 Shotts/Newmains to Hamilton, via Wishaw, University Hosp Wishaw, Netherton, Muirhouse, & Motherwell (Mon-Sun all day. Evening And Sunday Service Run Between Hamilton And Newmains Only)

X11 Newmains to Glasgow, via Wishaw, Netherton, Muirhouse, & Motherwell (Mon-Sun Daytime Only)

N240 Glasgow to Cleland, via, Parkhead, Tollcross, Birkenshaw, Bellshill, Motherwell, Muirhouse, Netherton, Wishaw, & Coltness (Sat & Sunday Night Bus. Runs Only from Glasgow.)

Railway
Wishaw railway station on the Argyle line (running from Lanark and Carstairs to Milngavie and Dalmuir).

A mainly half hourly Mon-Sat service & hourly late evening and all day on Sundays is provided by ScotRail which connects Wishaw to places such as:

Motherwell
Carluke
Cambuslang
Bellshill
Uddingston
Glasgow Central

Wishaw also has a second station, Shieldmuir railway station, serving the Craigneuk area of the town. There is also a few services to Edinburgh Waverley which run Mon-Sat. Some extra peak services are provided Mon-Fri to/from Carstairs and Anderston via Glasgow Central Low Level.

Trains on the West Coast Main Line pass through the town at 115 mph, but no passenger service trains stop there, as the main Wishaw South railway station on the line closed in 1958.

Roads
Wishaw is on the A71, Edinburgh, Livingston and Kilmarnock road which links the town to the M74 as well as the A73 which links the town with the Borders regions and the M8.

Following a campaign by local politicians, the area is now well signposted from the nearby M8 and M74 motorways. This move was considered necessary as although the town is not considered a principal destination from either of these roads and therefore not included as standard on the signage, it is now the home to the main hospital for an area stretching right down the M74 corridor almost to the English border approximately 75 miles (120 km) away.

Airport
The nearest airport to Wishaw is Glasgow Airport at 20 miles (32 km) distant, though at 26 miles (42 km) Edinburgh Airport is not much further. Connections to both airports are only via the cities they serve as no direct public transport links are available.

Wishawhill
Wishawhill is a small neighbourhood village in Wishaw. It is located to the north of the town. The suburb can be entered by Heathery Road or Cleland Road, with both roads leading onto the A721 or Glasgow Road running towards Wishaw Main Street.

Wishawhill is situated within walking distance from the major places in the town such as the Main Street, the large Tesco Extra superstore and Wishaw General Hospital. There is also the large golf course located to the north of the area. Virtually all of Wishawhill is low density residential housing and flats, with only a Community Center and the Wishaw Ex-Servicemen's Club being the non-residential buildings in the area. Due to its close proximity with Wishaw Main Street, there is only one local newsagent shop. The suburb also has a swing park and a football pitch.

The area used to be host to one Roman Catholic Primary School, St Matthew's, located on Pentland Road, until it was shut down in June 2010 due to councillors voting against their constituents wishes. This happened despite a large campaign by local residents to keep the school open. It is now being demolished due to repeated vandalism. Saint Thomas' in Pather is now the nearest Roman Catholic school to Wishawhill.

The Argyle Line next to Campsie Road passes through the suburb, with passenger services located at Wishaw railway station a mile away. Buses such as FirstGroup travel through the area, providing services to towns such as Motherwell. The rectangular road that run through the whole of Wishawhill (Campsie Road, Pentland Road, Grampian Road and Heathery Road) links to all the streets.

People
Notable people from Wishaw include:

Thomas Canfield Pomphrey, architect, was born here in 1881.
The Alexander Brothers, musicians and entertainers
Joe Baker, footballer
Andrew Barrowman, footballer
John Cleland, motor racing champion
Enrico Cocozza, underground filmmaker
Colin Cramb, footballer
Sir Samuel Curran, physicist, inventor of the scintillation counter, and founder of Strathclyde University
Alan Fisher, journalist
Tommy Gemmell, footballer
Jim Graham, Washington, D.C. politician
Roy Henderson, footballer
John Higgins, world snooker champion
Paul Higgins, actor and writer
Derek Holmes, footballer
The Jolt, 1970s pop group
Lewis Macleod, footballer
John Gibson Lockhart, biographer and novelist
Stan McEwan, footballer
Marie McLaughlin, opera singer
Lee Miller, footballer
Michael Moore, politician
Deborah Orr, journalist and columnist
Paul Quinn, footballer
Charles Reid (photographer) Victorian Photographer
Gordon Reid, actor
Anne Sharp, opera singer
Saint Phnx, musical group
Bill Scott, rugby player
Alison Turriff, musician
Frank S. Walsh, scientist
Alex Wilson, footballer
Thomas Winning, archbishop and cardinal
Nicholas McDonald, Singer and runner-up of ITV's The X Factor
Kieran Tierney, footballer for Arsenal and the Scotland national team

References

External links
 Wishaw High School Facebook page
 Wishaw High School Remembered – Website under construction
 
 History and Photographs of Wishaw Iron & Steel Works 1859 – 1930
  Scenes at West Cross Enrico Cocozza interviews local people.
  Scenes at West Cross Compilation of views around West Cross in Wishaw.

 
Towns in North Lanarkshire
Burghs